Michael Stephen Levine (born 1 June 1949) is the bassist and keyboardist for the Canadian hard rock band Triumph.

Early life
Levine was born in Toronto, Ontario. He attended Sir John A. Macdonald Collegiate Institute in Scarborough.

Career
In 1970 Levine helped to bring back together the band Motherlode, which had broken up after releasing one hit single and a couple of less popular recordings. They toured around northern and western Ontario before disbanding once again.

Levine played bass in the Toronto blues band Abernathy Shagnaster's Wash and Wear Band with guitarist Fred Keeler, keyboardists Peter Young and drummer Gil Moore. After the band's first single was recorded, Keeler and Young left; Levine and Moore recruited guitarist Rik Emmett, and the three founded the heavy metal band Triumph in 1974.

Although he did not sing lead on any of Triumph's music, Levine contributed backing vocals, bass, keyboard work, as well as songwriting. He also produced much of the band's early work, and performed on all of the band's ten studio albums.

Live, he also contributed much onstage banter with the audience, often smoking a large cigar during performances as well as wearing local sports team jerseys (especially NHL teams). On 1 October 1985, responding to a challenge by corporate sponsors, Levine travelled across Canada, visiting eight radio stations from Halifax to Vancouver in one day to promote Triumph's double album Stages.

After Triumph disbanded in 1993 Levine continued to merchandise the band's recordings and songs; he then went into business and began living part-time in Jamaica.

Levine also serves on the Board of Directors and Advisory Board for the Musicians' Rights Organization Canada.

Levine was also a contestant on the Christmas Eve 1996 episode of Wheel of Fortune.

References

External links
Official triumph website

1949 births
Living people
Canadian rock bass guitarists
Canadian rock keyboardists
Canadian record producers
Canadian heavy metal bass guitarists
Musicians from Toronto
Triumph (band)
Motherlode (band) members
20th-century Canadian keyboardists